"Just One Last Dance" is a song by German recording artist Sarah Connor from her third studio album, Key to My Soul (2003), featuring guest vocals by Connor's then-husband Marc Terenzi's former band, Natural. The song, written and produced by Kay Denar and Rob Tyger, bears a harmonic resemblance to "From Sarah with Love", an earlier hit from Connor, also composed and written by Denar and Tyger (along with Connor), both having the verses and choruses in B minor and D minor, respectively, as well as a key change to F sharp minor towards the end of the song. X-Cell Records released the song on 1 March 2004 as the second and final single from the album. Lyrically, the song alludes to couple's final dance in a Spanish cafe before they are forced to part ways.

"Just One Last Dance" attained commercial success throughout Central Europe. In Germany, it reached number one on the Media Control Charts, where it became Connor's third chart-topper was ranked among the 30 best-selling singles of 2004. Elsewhere in Europe, the song reached the top 10 in Austria, the Czech Republic, and Switzerland. Oliver Sommer directed the accompanying video for the single. Inspired by West Side Story, it portrays Connor as a high school girl who falls in love with a rivaling football player (Terenzi), much to her brother's dismay.

Track listings
European CD single

European CD maxi single

Charts

Weekly charts

Year-end charts

Certifications

References

2003 songs
2004 singles
Epic Records singles
Number-one singles in Germany
Sarah Connor (singer) songs
Songs written by Kay Denar
Songs written by Rob Tyger
X-Cell Records singles